Gonçalo Duarte may refer to:
Gonçalo Duarte (footballer, born 1997), Portuguese footballer
Gonçalo Duarte (footballer, born 1998), Portuguese footballer